The Handeni mine is one of the largest gold mines in the Tanzania and in the world. The mine is located in the north-east of the country in Tanga Region. The mine has estimated reserves of 3.94 million oz of gold.

References 

Gold mines in Tanzania